Milan Dozet (born 12 May 1979) is a Serbian professional basketball executive and former player. He is currently serving as the sporting director for Crvena zvezda.

Professional career
During his professional career, Dozet has played with the following clubs: Partizan, Zemun, Sloga, Crvena Zvezda, NIS Vojvodina, Kyiv, Panellinios, Proteas AEL, APOEL and Igokea.

In February 2016, his former club Igokea retired his jersey number.

National team career
Dozet was a member of the FR Yugoslavia under-20 team that won the gold medal at the 1998 FIBA Europe Under-20 Championship in Italy. He also won the bronze medal at the 2005 Summer Universiade in Izmir, Turkey.

Career achievements
 Bosnian League champion: 2  (with Igokea: 2012–13, 2013–14)
 Cypriot League champion: 1  (with APOEL: 2009–10) 
 YUBA League champion: 1  (with Partizan: 1996–97)
 Serbia-Montenegro Cup winner: 1  (with Crvena zvezda: 2003–04)
 Ukrainian Cup winner: 1  (with Kyiv: 2006–07)
 Cypriot Cup winner: 1  (with AEL: 2008–09) 
 Bosnian Cup winner: 1  (with Igokea: 2012–13)

Post-playing career 
On 3 August 2020, Dozet was elected as a member of the Assembly of the KK Crvena zvezda. On 1 January 2022, Crvena zvezda appointed Dozet as their new sporting director.

See also 
 List of KK Crvena zvezda players with 100 games played

References

External links
 Milan Dozet at aba-liga.com
 Milan Dozet at eurobasket.com
 Milan Dozet at euroleague.net
 Milan Dozet at fiba.com
 
 

1979 births
Living people
ABA League players
AEL Limassol B.C. players
APOEL B.C. players
BC Kyiv players
Croatian expatriate basketball people in Serbia
KK Crvena zvezda players
KK Crvena Zvezda executives
Members of the Assembly of KK Crvena zvezda
KK Igokea players
KK Partizan players
KK Vojvodina Srbijagas players
KK Sloga players
KK Zemun players
Serbian expatriate basketball people in Cyprus
Serbian expatriate basketball people in Bosnia and Herzegovina
Serbian expatriate basketball people in Greece
Serbian expatriate basketball people in Ukraine
Sportspeople from Gospić
Serbian men's basketball players
Serbs of Croatia
Small forwards
Universiade medalists in basketball
Universiade bronze medalists for Serbia and Montenegro
Medalists at the 2005 Summer Universiade